Gaylon Harrel Nickerson (born February 5, 1969) is an American former professional basketball player who played in the National Basketball Association (NBA) and other leagues. Born in Osceola, Arkansas, he attended Wichita State University, Butler Community College, Kansas State University, and Northwestern Oklahoma State University.

Nickerson was selected in the second round (34th overall) of the 1994 NBA draft by the Atlanta Hawks. He split the 1996–97 NBA season with the San Antonio Spurs and the Washington Bullets, playing just four games. Nickerson was also selected in the second round of the 1994 CBA Draft, and he led the league in scoring in 1996–97, averaging 22.5 points per game while with the Oklahoma City Cavalry.

References

External links
College & NBA stats @ basketballreference.com

1969 births
Living people
African-American basketball players
American expatriate basketball people in Italy
American expatriate basketball people in Spain
American men's basketball players
Atlanta Hawks draft picks
Basketball players from Arkansas
Butler Grizzlies men's basketball players
CB Valladolid players
Florida Beachdogs players
Galatasaray S.K. (men's basketball) players
Kansas State Wildcats men's basketball players
Liga ACB players
Northwestern Oklahoma State Rangers men's basketball players
Oklahoma City Cavalry players
Pallacanestro Virtus Roma players
People from Osceola, Arkansas
San Antonio Spurs players
Shooting guards
Washington Bullets players
Wichita State Shockers men's basketball players
21st-century African-American people
20th-century African-American sportspeople